Bacchisa aureosetosa is a species of beetle in the family Cerambycidae. It was described by Breuning in 1961. It is known from Malaysia.

References

A
Beetles described in 1961
Beetles of Asia